Avel de Knight (1923-1995) was an African-American artist, art educator, and art critic. His works are in the collections of the Metropolitan Museum of Art, the Walker Art Center, and the University of Richmond Museums.

Early life and education 
De Knight was born in New York. His birth year has been given as 1921, 1923, 1925, 1931, and 1933. His parents immigrated to the United States from Barbados and Puerto Rico. He is the younger brother of René DeKnight.

De Knight studied art at the Pratt Institute from 1941-1942. He joined the Army and served in a segregated unit until the end of World War II. In 1946, he moved to Paris where he used the G.I. Bill to attend the École des Beaux-Arts, Académie de la Grande Chaumière, and the Académie Julian.

Career 
De Knight painted watercolors and often practiced the gouache painting technique.

He taught at the Art Students League of New York and the National Academy School of Fine Arts.

Collections 

 Metropolitan Museum of Art
 Walker Art Center
 University of Richmond
 Schomburg Center for Research in Black Culture
 The Chrysler Museum of Art
 Lehigh University Art Galleries

Exhibitions 

 Afro-American Images 1971: The Vision of Percy Ricks, Delaware Art Museum 2021

References

See also 

 Herbert Gentry
 Romare Bearden

African-American artists
Pratt Institute alumni
African-American painters